Mahmoud Abdullah Haroon (1920 – 6 November 2008) was a Pakistani politician with a career spanning over five decades who served as chairman of the Dawn Media Group, publisher of many newspapers in Pakistan.

Early life and career
He was the second son of  Abdullah Haroon, the first being Yusuf Haroon, one of the leaders of Pakistan Movement. Both brothers, Mahmoud Haroon and Yusuf Haroon, had actively participated in the Pakistan Movement.

During his political career, Mahmoud Haroon served as two-time Governor of Sindh, Federal Interior Minister during General Muhammad Zia-ul-Haq's regime, Federal Defence Minister, and Mayor of Karachi. He was also the founder of the Dubai-based newspaper Khaleej Times.

References

External links

1920 births
2008 deaths
Dawn Media Group people
Mahmoud
Governors of Sindh
Pakistani people of Gujarati descent
Defence Ministers of Pakistan
Interior ministers of Pakistan
Mayors of Karachi
Pakistani mass media owners
Pakistani expatriates in the United Kingdom
Politicians from Karachi
Memon people
St. Patrick's High School, Karachi alumni